The Fabulous Johnny Cash is the second studio album by American country singer Johnny Cash and his first to be released by Columbia Records, marking the beginning of 28 years with the label. The album was released on November 3, 1958, not long after Cash's departure from Sun Records.

Content
The album features five tracks written by Cash and backing vocal performances by The Jordanaires (who at this time were also regulars on Elvis Presley's recording sessions for RCA Records). Overall, even though the album is only 29 minutes in length, it is considered one of Cash's most cohesive pieces. This is largely because his sessions with Columbia were completed over a two-month period. That is greatly reduced when compared to the year by year sessions by Sun Records.

Commercial performance
The Fabulous Johnny Cash was a successful debut on Columbia for Cash as it sold over half a million copies during its initial release. Although Billboard did not publish a chart for country albums in 1958, the album peaked at #19 on the Billboard Best Selling LP's chart.

Reissues
The album was reissued in 2002 by Sony Music's Legacy imprint. The re-issue contains six bonus tracks and unedited versions of the songs. Legacy reissued the album on 180 gram vinyl for Record Store Day on November 23, 2012.

Track listing

Personnel
Musicians

Johnny Cash - vocals, rhythm guitar
Luther Perkins - lead guitar
Don Helms - steel guitar
Marshall Grant - bass
The Jordanaires - background vocals
Marvin Hughes - piano
Buddy Harman - drums on "Suppertime," "Oh, What a Dream" and "I'll Remember You"
Morris Palmer - drums

Additional personnel
Al Quaglieri - Producer
Don Law - Producer
Billy Altman - Liner Notes
Don Hunstein - Photography
Seth Foster - Mastering
Mark Wilder - Mastering, Mixing
Hal Adams - Cover Photo
Stacey Boyle - Tape Research
Kay Smith - Tape Research
Matt Kelly - Tape Research
Geoff Gillette - Sleeve Design
Steven Berkowitz - A&R
Darren Salmieri - A&R
Patti Matheny - A&R
Howard Fritzson - Art Direction
Nick Shaffran - Series Consultant

Charts
Album - Billboard (United States)

Singles - Billboard (United States)

References 

Johnny Cash albums
1959 albums
Columbia Records albums